A radiator is any of several types of heat exchangers designed to transfer thermal energy from one medium to another for the purpose of cooling or heating.

Radiator can also refer to:

 Radiator (heating), the conventional heating of a building
 Radiator (engine cooling)
 Black body, an object with perfect radiation absorption and emission
 Information radiator, a display of information posted on a wall where passers-by can see it, typically used in software development
 Radiator (album), a 1997 album by the Super Furry Animals
 Radiator (band), or their self-titled 1999 album
 Radiator (film), a 2014 film
 Electric radiator, a ubiquitous household heating appliance

See also 
 The Radiators (disambiguation)